Since its opening in 1995, the TD Garden in Boston, Massachusetts, has hosted many local, regional and international artists, spanning a wide range of musical genres. A list of notable concerts are given in the table below. All events are arranged in a chronological order.

1990s
1995

1996

1997

1998

1999

2000s
2000

2001

2002

2003

2004

2005

2006

2007

2008

2009

2010s
2010

2011

2012

2013

2014

2015

2016

2017

2018

2019

2020s
2021

2022

2023

Notes

References

External links
 TD Garden – Calendar

Concerts at TD Garden
Concerts at TD Garden
Entertainment events in the United States
Events in Boston
Lists of concerts and performances by location
Lists of events by venue
Lists of events in the United States